Pietà with Saints Clare, Francis and Mary Magdalene is a 1585 oil on canvas painting by Annibale Carracci, now in the Galleria nazionale di Parma.

It was produced for the high altar of the Capuchin church in Parma as one of the artist's first works outside Bologna. The commission may have been linked to the Farnese family, which had a fundamental role in the artist's future career. The family had backed the Capuchins establishing friaries in Parma and Piacenza and in the 1570s duke Ottavio Farnese assigned them the now-destroyed churches Santa Maria Maddalena in Parma and San Bernardino in Piacenza, having financed the rebuilding of both.

It was praised in all the historic sources on Annibale, such as Francesco Scannelli's Il microcosmo della pittura (1657), Carlo Cesare Malvasia's Felsina Pittrice (1678), Giovanni Pietro Bellori's Vite de' pittori, scultori e architetti moderni in 1672. Bellori also refers to Federico Zuccari's praise for the work. The Napoleonic regime confiscated the work in 1799 and it was only returned to Parma in 1815, entering the Galleria later that year. It was restored for the 1956 Carracci exhibition in Bologna, revealing the date 1585 in Arabic numerals on the stone under Christ's right hand, confirming the date proposed by art historian Hermann Voss.

Gallery

References

Bibliography (in Italian)
 Corrado Ricci, La Regia Galleria di Parma, Parma, 1896
 Angela Ghilardi, Scheda dell'opera; in Lucia Fornari Schianchi (a cura di) Galleria Nazionale di Parma. Catalogo delle opere, il Cinquecento, Milano, 1998
 Eugenio Riccomini, Dopo Correggio: appunti sulla pittura a Parma dal Correggio ad Annibale Carracci, in Emilian Painting of the 16th and 17th Centuries, Bologna, 1987
 Lucia Fornari Schianchi, Come si forma un museo: il caso della Galleria Nazionale di Parma; in Fornari Schianchi (a cura di), Galleria Nazionale di Parma. Catalogo delle opere dall'Antico al Cinquecento, Milano, 1997
 Alberto Crispo, L'arte nelle chiese e nei conventi cappuccini del ducato farnesiano, in I cappuccini in Emilia Romagna. Storia di una presenza, a cura di Pozzi e Prodi, Bologna 2002, pp. 410–434
 Daniele Benati, scheda dell'opera nel catalogo a cura di D. Benati ed E. Riccomini Annibale Carracci, Electa, Milano, 2007, pp. 174–175.

1585 paintings
Paintings by Annibale Carracci
Collections of the Galleria nazionale di Parma
Paintings of Clare of Assisi
Paintings of Francis of Assisi
Paintings depicting Mary Magdalene
Carracci